Howard is a city in Miner County, South Dakota, United States. The population was 848 at the 2020 census. It is the county seat and most populous city in Miner County.

History

The city of Howard was established in 1881, shortly after the Southern Minnesota Railway was extended to that point. The city was named for Howard Farmer, the son of the townsite owner, J. D. Farmer. In 1883, when Miner and Sanborn counties were organized, the town was named the county seat of Miner County.

One of the first known photographs of a tornado is an image of the 1884 Howard, South Dakota tornado.

The first public library in Dakota Territory was the Howard Public Library, chartered in 1886.

Howard became the first municipality in South Dakota to own and operate its own wind turbines in 2001.

Since 2001, over 200 new jobs have been created in the community.  From 1996 to 2008, the city's sales tax revenues increased 123%.

Geography
Howard is located southeastern South Dakota at  (44.010422, -97.526435). The city is situated on South Dakota Highway 34.

Howard has been assigned the ZIP code 57349 and the FIPS place code 30460.

Climate

Demographics

2010 census
As of the census of 2010, there were 858 people, 414 households, and 195 families residing in the city. The racial makeup of the city was 97.8% White, 0.1% Native American, 0.1% Asian, 0.6% from other races, and 1.4% from two or more races. Hispanic or Latino of any race were 1.3% of the population.

There were 414 households, of which 20.8% had children under the age of 18 living with them, 38.2% were married couples living together, 7.0% had a female householder with no husband present, 1.9% had a male householder with no wife present, and 52.9% were non-families. 49.3% of all households were made up of individuals, and 28.5% had someone living alone who was 65 years of age or older. The average household size was 1.97 and the average family size was 2.92.

The median age in the city was 50.5 years. 21.2% of residents were under the age of 18; 4.1% were between the ages of 18 and 24; 17.2% were from 25 to 44; 27.2% were from 45 to 64; and 30.1% were 65 years of age or older. The gender makeup of the city was 46.9% male and 53.1% female.

2000 census
As of the census of 2000, there were 1,071 people, 493 households, and 273 families residing in the city. The population density was 1,138.7 people per square mile (439.9/km2). There were 557 housing units at an average density of 592.2 per square mile (228.8/km2). The racial makeup of the city was 98.13% White, 0.47% African American, 0.65% Native American, 0.28% Asian, 0.28% from other races, and 0.19% from two or more races. Hispanic or Latino of any race were 1.31% of the population.

There were 493 households, out of which 24.1% had children under the age of 18 living with them, 44.4% were married couples living together, 8.1% had a female householder with no husband present, and 44.6% were non-families. 41.8% of all households were made up of individuals, and 25.8% had someone living alone who was 65 years of age or older. The average household size was 2.06 and the average family size was 2.84.

In the city, the population was spread out, with 22.7% under the age of 18, 5.4% from 18 to 24, 21.4% from 25 to 44, 18.3% from 45 to 64, and 32.2% who were 65 years of age or older. The median age was 46 years. For every 100 females, there were 82.5 males. For every 100 females age 18 and over, there were 78.4 males.

The median income for a household in the city was $26,544, and the median income for a family was $36,518. Males had a median income of $26,250 versus $20,054 for females. The per capita income for the city was $15,121. About 5.3% of families and 9.6% of the population were below the poverty line, including 8.3% of those under age 18 and 16.2% of those age 65 or over.

Education
The Howard School District (encompassing most of Miner County and small portions of McCook, Hanson, and Kingsbury counties) is based in Howard. The district operates Howard Elementary School, Howard Jr. High School and Howard Senior High School within the town.

St. Agatha School was a private, Catholic school located in Howard. The high school closed in 1966. The grade school closed a few years later.

Notable people
 Johan Andreas Holvik, author and educator
 Wayne Rasmussen, professional football player
 Perry Doerr, former New Jersey government official
 Tom Kilian, educator Augustana University and Kilian Community College, historian, futuri
Jon Robert Fosheim  born and raised in Howard. He was a lawyer in Huron and then he became a Circuit Court Judge for 19 years in Beadle County. He also became the Chief Justice of the Supreme Court for the state of SD.

See also
 List of cities in South Dakota

References

External links

Cities in South Dakota
Cities in Miner County, South Dakota
County seats in South Dakota